Bishunpur  is a town in Shivaraj Municipality in Kapilvastu District in the Lumbini Zone of southern Nepal. The former village development committee was transformed into a Municipality from 18 May 2014 by merging the existing Birpur, Nepal, Chanai, Bishunpur, Jawabhari and Shivapur village development committees. At the time of the 1991 Nepal census it had a population of 2942 people living in 472 individual households.

References

Populated places in Kapilvastu District